Anton Krautheimer (born 1879; died during the 20th century) was a German sculptor who lived in Munich.

Biography
From 1900 on, Krautheimer studied in Munich at the Academy of Fine Arts. His teachers were Josef Eberle, Wilhelm von Rümann and Adolf von Hildebrand. During his studies, he worked for the jewelry manufacture Victor Mayer in Pforzheim/Germany as a jewelry designer and steel engraver. The archive there preserves photographs of jewelry after his designs, his drawing-book with designs of Art Nouveau jewelry and many copies of letters that Victor Mayer wrote to him.

In 1908, he won the prestigious Rome Prize and in 1909, he started to work as an independent sculptor in Munich. Henceforth, he exhibited statues in marble, bronze and wood, busts and small sculptures with the Munich Secession and the Exhibitions in the Munich Glaspalast. Many of his works are still to be found in Germany’s public space, for example, the Fountain of Heracles in the Dom-Pedro-Platz in Munich, the tomb of the Lotz-family in the cemetery in Berlin Zehlendorf and the statue of Siegfried on the Siegried-Fountain in Worms, Germany made by order of Adolf von Hildebrand.

References 
 Siegrid Braunfels: Skulptur und Architektur des Wasserspiels. Die Brunnen Adolf von Hildebrands, München 2005, p. 86
 Anne-Barbara Knerr: Schmuck und Sinn. Fragen und Antworten zum Phänomen Schmuck, Norderstedt 2009, p. 65
 Anton Krautheimer in: Thieme/Becker, Allgemeines Lexikon der Künstler von der Antike bis zur Gegenwart, Band 21, Leipzig 1927, p. 473f
 Documents preserved in the Victor Mayer Archive

External links 
 Tomb of the Lotz family in the cemetery of Berlin/Zehlendorf
 photograph of the fountain of Heracles in Munich

1879 births
German sculptors
German male sculptors
Year of death unknown
Art Nouveau sculptors
Artists from Munich